Olyutorsky may refer to:

Olyutorsky District
Olyutor Gulf (Olyutorsky Zaliv)
Olyutor Peninsula
Olyutor Range (Olyutorsky Khrebet)
Cape Olyutor (Mys Olyutorsky)

See also
Alyutor